Do You Believe Me Now may refer to:
Do You Believe Me Now (album), by Jimmy Wayne
"Do You Believe Me Now" (Jimmy Wayne song), its title track
"Do You Believe Me Now" (Vern Gosdin song), from the album Chiseled in Stone